Lithoprocris is a genus of moths in the subfamily Arctiinae erected by Paul Dognin in 1899.

Species
 Lithoprocris hamon Druce, 1902
 Lithoprocris jason Dognin, 1899
 Lithoprocris methyalea Hampson, 1900
 Lithoprocris postcaerulescens Rothschild, 1913

References

External links

Lithosiini
Moth genera